Vyacheslav Vladimirovich Ovchinnikov (February 19, 1932 in Leningrad, USSR – March 16, 1993 in Saint Petersburg, Russia) was a Soviet Russian painter, a member of the Saint Petersburg Union of Artists (before 1992 — the Leningrad Union of Artists), who lived and worked in Leningrad, regarded as one of representatives of the Leningrad School of Painting, most famous for his landscape painting.

See also

 Fine Art of Leningrad
 Leningrad School of Painting
 List of 20th-century Russian painters
 List of painters of Saint Petersburg Union of Artists
 Saint Petersburg Union of Artists

References

Sources 
 Выставка произведений ленинградских художников 1960 года. Каталог. — Л: Художник РСФСР, 1961. — с.29.
 Ленинград. Зональная выставка. — Л: Художник РСФСР, 1965. — с.37.
 Советская Россия. Третья Республиканская художественная выставка. Каталог. — М: Министерство культуры РСФСР, 1967. — с.42.
 Наш современник. Зональная выставка произведений ленинградских художников 1975 года. Каталог. Л., Художник РСФСР, 1980. C.21.
 Справочник членов Союза художников СССР. Т.2 М., Советский художник, 1979. C.145.
 Справочник членов Ленинградской организации Союза художников РСФСР. Л., Художник РСФСР, 1987. C.95.
 L' École de Leningrad. Auction Catalogue. Paris, Drouot Richelieu, 16 Juin 1989. P.74-75.
 Традиции школы живописи государственной художественно-промышленной академии имени А. Л. Штиглица. Кафедра общей живописи. СПб., 2010. С.15, 271.

1932 births
1993 deaths
20th-century Russian painters
Russian male painters
Soviet painters
Socialist realist artists
Leningrad School artists
Members of the Leningrad Union of Artists
Repin Institute of Arts alumni
20th-century Russian male artists